A Primate Equilibrium Platform (PEP) is a device used to train chimpanzees and other primates in maneuvers similar to those of a flight simulator. The chimpanzees are conditioned, with a series of electric shocks, to keep the rolling platform level.

The purpose of the platform is to determine primate competency under various levels of poisoning from radiation or chemicals used in common biological weaponry.

After the subject has successfully completed a seven phase training procedure on the platform, the primate is either irradiated or poisoned to determine how long it can keep the platform level at different degrees of exposure, with electric shocks resulting from inability to maintain a level platform.

The goal of the PEP research is to determine the ability of fighter pilots to deliver payloads in a second-strike scenario, in which the pilots may have been exposed to radiation or chemical or biological weapons.

Primates were able to keep a simulator level within 1 degree of stabilization across the multiple axis on a 16 axis simulator.  

The program was based in White Sands.

Other references
 The PEP has received more fame than other animal experimentation devices due to its appearance in the 1987 film Project X.
 Additionally, the PEP is the focus of some controversy from the animal rights community, and it is discussed at some length by Peter Singer in his book Animal Liberation.

References
Defence Technical Information Centre: Research with the Primate Equilibrium Platform in a Radiation Environment
Defence Technical Information Centre: Training Procedure for Primate Equilibrium Platform

Animal testing on primates